Anal Cunt was an American grindcore band from Newton, Massachusetts. Formed in 1988, the discography of the group consists of eight studio albums, one live album, five compilation albums, eleven extended plays (EPs) and eight split EPs. Anal Cunt disbanded in 2011 due to the death of frontman Seth Putnam.

Albums

Studio albums

Live albums

Compilation albums

Extended plays

Solo EPs

Split EPs

Other appearances

References 

Punk rock group discographies
Discographies of American artists